Joseph Lessard (April 8, 1847 – March 27, 1914) was a politician in the Quebec, Canada.  He served as Member of the Legislative Assembly.

Early life
He was born on April 8, 1847 in Saint-Léon, Mauricie.

Political career
Lessard won a seat to the Legislative Assembly of Quebec as a Conservative candidate in 1890 in the district of Maskinongé with the support of local Catholic Bishop Louis-François Richer Laflèche.  He succeeded Joseph-Hormisdas Legris of Honoré Mercier’s Parti National.

In 1892 he lost re-election against Liberal candidate Hector Caron.

Death
He died on March 27, 1914.

Footnotes

1847 births
1914 deaths
Conservative Party of Quebec MNAs
French Quebecers